Kochów may refer to the following places in Poland:
Kochów, Świętokrzyskie Voivodeship (south-central Poland)
Kochów, Masovian Voivodeship (east-central Poland)